Disturbia is a 2007 American neo-noir psychological thriller film directed by D. J. Caruso and written by Christopher Landon and Carl Ellsworth. Starring Shia LaBeouf, David Morse, Sarah Roemer and Carrie-Anne Moss, it is about a teenager who is placed on house arrest for assaulting his school teacher and begins to spy on his neighbors, believing one of them is a serial killer.

Partially inspired by Alfred Hitchcock's Rear Window, the film was released on April 13, 2007. It received generally positive reviews, and grossed $118 million against a budget of $20 million.

Plot
Troubled by the sudden death of his father in a car accident, outcast teenager Kale Brecht punches his Spanish teacher who invokes his father while reprimanding him at school. For the assault, Kale is sentenced by a sympathetic judge to three months under house arrest, with an ankle monitor and a proximity sensor.

Kale is initially happy with his punishment, watching television and playing video games, until his frustrated mother Julie cuts his TV cable and internet access. Kale's boredom leads him to watch his neighborhood using binoculars, including his new next-door neighbor Ashley Carlson, whom Kale is attracted to, and his other next-door neighbor Robert Turner, a single man living alone. Upon observing his neighbors, he learns things about them, and one night Kale becomes suspicious of Turner after he returns home in a 1960s Ford Mustang with a dented fender, which matches the description of a car given on a news report of a serial killer at large.

Kale befriends Ashley, and the pair begin to spy on Turner together, along with Kale's best friend Ronnie. They observe Turner arrive home with a woman; she is seen running around his house in a panic, but later appears to leave in her car.

His anger is exacerbated by Ashley throwing a party at her house next-door, where Kale observes Ashley flirting with people and socializing with popular groups from school. As a petty act of jealousy, Kale moves his speakers out onto the roof and blasts non party and chill music by Minnie Riperton in order to disrupt the party. Ashley furiously breaks into the house to turn off the music, and Kale reveals he has been observing her since she moved in and is romantically interested in her. The pair share their first kiss.

The following day, Kale asks Ashley to follow Turner to the supermarket so that Ronnie can break into Turner's car to get the code of the garage controller. Ashley agrees, but is caught in the parking lot by Turner, who then intimidates her. She tells Kale she doesn't want to take part anymore, shaken by her encounter with Turner.

Ronnie realizes he left his phone in Turner's car and breaks into Turner's house to retrieve it, with Kale watching at a distance. While inside, Ronnie gets trapped when the garage door closes; Kale attempts to rescue him but alerts the police upon leaving his property with the ankle monitor. The police arrive and search the garage, as Kale angrily accuses Turner of murder, but they find nothing but a bag containing a roadkill deer.

In an attempt to ask Turner not to press charges for Kale's breaking and entering, Julie goes across the street to talk to Turner. Ronnie reveals that he has escaped from Turner's house. Kale watches the video Ronnie made while running through Turner's house and he notices something strange behind a vent, something wrapped in plastic. Upon freezing the frame and zooming in, Kale discovers it to be the corpse of the woman from earlier; proving that he was right all along. Meanwhile, next door, Turner incapacitates Julie and holds her captive. Turner then enters Kale's house, bashing Ronnie on the head with a baseball bat and binding and gagging Kale. He reveals his plan to frame Kale for the murders and make it appear that Kale then killed himself.

Ashley arrives, giving Kale a chance to attack Turner. He throws him from the top of the stairs before Ashley frees him from his bindings. They then jump out of the window into the pool as Turner resurfaces. Kale's ankle monitor again alerts the police, and he enters Turner's home to search for his mother. In a hidden room, Kale finds ample evidence of Turner's previous murders, including a woman's dress and wig, indicating Turner pretended to be the woman leaving the house the night Kale and Ashley were watching.

The officer who monitors Kale's escapes arrives at the scene but Turner snaps his neck. Meanwhile, Kale stumbles upon the decaying remains of murder victims, as well as their driver's licenses and belongings, and finds his mother bound and gagged in the cellar. Turner appears, slashes Kale in the back and pins him to a wall, but before Turner can kill Kale, Julie stabs him in the leg with a screwdriver, allowing Kale to grab a pair of gardening shears and impale Turner in the chest with them, finally killing him.

In the aftermath, Kale is shown being allowed to cut his ankle bracelet off for good behavior. Later he gets revenge on his young neighbors, the Greenwood boys, who had pulled pranks on Kale previously. After that he kisses Ashley on his sofa, while Ronnie playfully video tapes them.

Cast

 Shia LaBeouf as Kale Brecht, a 17-year-old high school student who is under house arrest and begins to suspect that his neighbor is a serial killer.
 David Morse as Robert Turner, Kale's neighbor whom the three teens suspect of being a serial killer.
 Sarah Roemer as Ashley Carlson, Kale's neighbor and love interest who assists in Kale's mission to get to the truth.
 Carrie-Anne Moss as Julie Brecht, Kale's mother who begins to develop a more authoritative attitude towards him.
 Aaron Yoo as Ronald "Ronnie" Chu, Kale's best friend who helps him spy on the neighbors.
 Viola Davis as Detective Parker, the detective in charge of Kale's case.
 Jose Pablo Cantillo as Officer Gutierrez, a police officer who is in charge of Kale’s case and likes to torment him.
 Matt Craven as Daniel "Danny" Brecht, Kale's father.
 Luciano Rauso and Brandon and Daniel Caruso as the Greenwood boys.
 Kevin Quinn as Mr. Carlson.
 Elyse Mirto as Mrs. Carlson.
 Suzanne Rico and Kent Shocknek as news anchors.
 Rene Rivera as Señor Gutierrez, Officer Gutierrez's cousin and Kale's Spanish teacher whom he assaults, resulting in Kale’s house arrest.
 Amanda Walsh as Minnie Tyco.
 Charles Carroll as Judge.
 Gillian Shure as Turner's Club Girl.
 Dominic Daniel as Policeman.
 Lisa Robin as Big Wheel Mom.
 Cindy Lou Adkins as Mrs. Greenwood.

Production

Development and writing
The script was written in the 1990s and was optioned. The original studio let the option expire after hearing about Christopher Reeve's remake of Rear Window. It was not until 2004 that the script was rewritten and sold.

Executive producer Steven Spielberg arranged for LaBeouf to be on the casting shortlist for this film because he was impressed by LaBeouf's work on Holes. Caruso auditioned over a hundred males for the role in five weeks before settling on LaBeouf as he was looking for someone "who guys would really like and respond to, because he wasn't going to be such a pretty boy". LaBeouf was attracted to the role because of the director's 2002 film The Salton Sea, which he complimented as one of his favorite films. Before filming started, the two watched the thriller films Rear Window starring James Stewart, Straw Dogs starring Dustin Hoffman, and The Conversation starring Gene Hackman. They also viewed the 1989 romantic film Say Anything... and "mixed all the movies together." LaBeouf says he spoke to people on house arrest and locked himself in a room with the bracelet to feel what the confinement of house arrest is like. He commented in an interview, "...it's hard. I'm not going to say it's harder than jail, but it's tough. House arrest is hard because everything is available. [...] The temptation sucks. That's the torture of it." Caruso gave him the freedom to improvise whenever necessary to make the dialogue appeal to the current generation.

Filming
Filmed on location in the cities of Whittier, California and Pasadena, California. Filming took place from January 6, 2006 to April 29, 2006. The homes of Kale and Mr. Turner, which were supposed to be across from each other, were actually located in two different cities.

During filming, LaBeouf began a program that saw him gain twenty five pounds of muscle in preparation of his future films Transformers and Indiana Jones and the Kingdom of the Crystal Skull.

According to LaBeouf, David Morse who plays Mr. Turner, did not speak to LaBeouf or any of the other younger actors while on set. LaBeouf said, "When we finished filming, he was very friendly. But he's a method actor, and as long as we were shooting, he wouldn't say a word to us."

Music

Soundtrack

Disturbia: Original Motion Picture Soundtrack is a soundtrack to the film of the same name, released on March 4, 2007 in the United States by Lakeshore Records.

Score

Disturbia: Original Motion Picture Score is a score to the film of the same name. It is composed by Geoff Zanelli, conducted by Bruce Fowler and produced by Skip Williamson. It was released on July 10, 2007 in the United States by Lakeshore Records.

Release

Home media 
The film was released on DVD and HD DVD on August 7, 2007 and on Blu-ray Disc on March 15, 2008.  In the United States, DVD sales brought in $35,084,232 in revenue, from 1,485,244 sold DVD units. This does not include Blu-ray sales.

In the "Making of Disturbia" section of the DVD's special features section it is revealed that LaBeouf and Morse did not have much contact off-set, so as to make the fight scenes at the end of the movie as realistic as possible.

Lawsuit
The Sheldon Abend Revocable Trust filed a lawsuit against Steven Spielberg, DreamWorks, its parent company Viacom, and Universal Studios on September 5, 2008. The suit alleged that Disturbia infringed on the rights to Cornell Woolrich's 1942 short story "It Had to Be Murder" (the basis for the Alfred Hitchcock film Rear Window), and that DreamWorks never bothered to obtain motion picture rights to the intellectual property and evaded compensating the rights holder for the alleged appropriation. (Ownership of the copyright in Woolrich's original story "It Had to Be Murder" and its use as the basis for the movie Rear Window was previously litigated before the United States Supreme Court in Stewart v. Abend, 495 U.S. 207 (1990).)  Contrary to some media reports, the claim was based on the original Woolrich short story, not the movie Rear Window.

This claim was rejected by the U.S. District Court in Abend v. Spielberg, 748 F.Supp.2d 200 (S.D.N.Y. 2010), on the basis that the original Woolrich short story and Disturbia are only similar at a high level of generality and abstraction. "Their similarities derive entirely from unprotectible elements and the total look and feel of the works is so distinct that no reasonable trier of fact could find the works substantially similar within the meaning of copyright law." Disturbia contained many subplots not in the original short story.

After the dismissal of the copyright claim in federal court, the Abend Trust filed another lawsuit in California state court against Universal Studios and the Hitchcock Estate on October 28, 2010, for a breach of contract claim based on earlier agreements which allegedly restricted the use of ideas from the original Woolrich short story and the movie Rear Window whether or not the ideas are copyright protectable, that the defendants had entered into with the Abend Trust after the Supreme Court's Stewart v. Abend decision.

Reception

Box office
Disturbia grossed $80.2 million in North America and $37.9 million in other territories for a worldwide total of $118.1 million, against a budget of $20 million.

The film was released in the United States on April 13 and opened first at the box office with $22.2 million. The film remained number one at the box office for the next two weeks, grossing $13 million and $9 million, respectively. In its fourth week, it earned $5.7 million and finished second behind the record-breaking Spider-Man 3 ($151.1 million).

Critical response
 On Metacritic, the film has a score of 62 out of 100 based on reviews from 28 critics, indicating "generally favorable reviews". Audiences polled by CinemaScore gave the film an average grade of "A−" on an A+ to F scale.

The film earned a "two thumbs up" rating from Richard Roeper and A.O. Scott (filling in for Roger Ebert), with Roeper saying, "This is a cool little thriller with big scares and fine performances." William Thomas of Empire gave it 3/5 stars and wrote: "despite the 'edgy' title, Disturbia is content to be a multiplex-friendly teen thriller with a higher degree of slickness and smarts than most of its contemporaries."

David Denby of The New Yorker judged the film "a travesty", adding: "The dopiness of it, however, may be an indication not so much of cinematic ineptitude as of the changes in a movie culture that was once devoted to adults and is now rather haplessly and redundantly devoted to kids." Peter Bradshaw of The Guardian gave it 2/5 stars, writing: "Despite the interesting set-up, the action degenerates into obvious implausibility and silliness - fatal for a suspense thriller - and boredom sets in."

Accolades

See also
 List of films featuring surveillance

References

External links
  (archive) 
 
 
 
 
 

2007 films
2007 psychological thriller films
American psychological thriller films
American slasher films
American serial killer films
2000s English-language films
Films about security and surveillance
American neo-noir films
Teen thriller films
Films shot in Los Angeles County, California
Films involved in plagiarism controversies
DreamWorks Pictures films
The Montecito Picture Company films
Paramount Pictures films
Films directed by D. J. Caruso
Films scored by Geoff Zanelli
Films with screenplays by Christopher B. Landon
Films set in Wisconsin
2000s American films